Kang Rae-yeon is a South Korean actress and model. She is known for her roles in dramas such as The Time We Were Not in Love and Gogh, The Starry Night.

Early life
Kang was born an only child and a third-generation South Korean; her family was originally from Shandong, China. She attended Seoul Chinese Primary School and Seoul Overseas Chinese High School, and graduated from Sejong University with a degree in hotel management.

Career
Kang started a modeling career posing for magazines. She made her acting debut in the 1998 film Zzang. She went on to work on television series The Bean Chaff of My Life, Forever Love, and My Love Patzzi, among others. Beginning in 2004, Kang took a three-year break from acting to go backpacking across several countries including the United States, Canada, India, and Egypt. She returned to acting in KBS1's Heaven & Earth.

Kang appeared in SBS dramas in On Air, A Thousand Days' Promise and Queen of Reversals on MBC. In the same year she appeared in movie Sunny and Juvenile Offender. She was recognized for her acting skills. She also amazed the audience, when she spoke in English, Chinese and Korean. The netizens were happy, when she returned to acting, saying it's been a while.

Kang signed an exclusive contract with Will Entertainment in mid-2014. Two years later, she signed with Mystic Actors, Mystic Story's branch for actors. She was cast as hall manager Gung Rae-yeon in Seoul Broadcasting System's (SBS) 2018 romantic comedy series Wok of Love.

Filmography

Television series

Film

References

External links 
 
 
 

1981 births
21st-century South Korean actresses
Living people
People from Seoul
Sejong University alumni
South Korean female models
South Korean film actresses
South Korean people of Chinese descent
South Korean television actresses